Bouderies is a settlement in Kasserine, Tunisia, in North Africa.

The settlement is located on the Algerian border north of Fériana. It is the site of a natural spring, and nearby Mount Jebel ech Chambi is, at 1,544 m, one of the highest points in Tunisia.

History
Ain Bou Dries is the site of Drua, a ruined Roman fort, of the Roman province of Byzacena.

During late antiquity the town was seat of a Christian bishopric.

 In 411, the towns bishop, Antonianus, attended the Council of Carthage with the Donatist delegation. The town survived until at least the Arab–Byzantine wars of 698AD.

The 1st Armored Division of the United States Army passed through Bouderies during World War II.

Today the bishopric of Drua survives as a titular bishopric with the current bishop being John Joseph Jenik, auxiliary bishop of New York City.

References

Cities in Tunisia